Alexander Laws House is a historic home located at Leipsic, Kent County, Delaware.  It is a -story, gable roofed frame structure with rear wings. The earliest part of the house may be the one-story kitchen wing, with the main section of the house added between 1820 and 1830.  It features a fine Eastlake porch, round-arched
roof dormers, and handsome Greek Revival style entry.

It was listed on the National Register of Historic Places in 1983.

References

Houses on the National Register of Historic Places in Delaware
Houses completed in 1830
Houses in Kent County, Delaware
1830 establishments in Delaware
National Register of Historic Places in Kent County, Delaware
Leipsic, Delaware